Rigardus Antonius "Rigard" van Klooster (born April 6, 1989 in Linschoten) is a former Dutch track racing cyclist and speed skater.

Sport career

Speed skating 
Rigard van Klooster started his sports career with speed skating. He started with speed skating when he was very young and started competing in 2002 and rode his first national junior championship in 2006 as a B-junior. Since the season 2007–2008 Van Klooster skated for Gewest Noord-Holland/Utrecht and was a trainee at the APPM-team since the 2008–2009 season. As an elite athlete Van Klooster competed in 2010 and 2011 at both the Dutch Allround Championships and Dutch Single Distance Championships. He finished 17th overall at the 2010 KNSB Dutch Allround Championships and 22nd overall at the 2011 KNSB Dutch Allround Championships.

Track cycling 
2011
A wingate test in early 2011 showed that Van Klooster had potential for track cycling. After some track cycling sessions the KNWU offered van Klooster a place in the development team and a room in Papendal, near the velodrome in Apeldoorn. Van Klooster took the offer and quit speed skating. He rode his first international competition at the Trois Jours d'Aigle where he finished 13th. Two weeks after riding the two days of Wien, Van Klooster became the Dutch national sprint champion for Amateurs begin December. Later that month, after getting an elite license, he placed 4th in the 1 km time trial at Dutch national track championships and 7th in both the keirin and the sprint.
2012
Van Klooster competed in the International Track Grand Prix of Alkmaar, Perth, Colorado Springs, Cottbus and Vienna. In Vienna he won bronze in the team sprint. Based on his results he qualified for the 2012 European Track Championships where he finished 6th in the team sprint (together with Hylke van Grieken and Matthijs Büchli) and 12th in the keirin. At the UCI Track Cycling World Cup Classic in Glasgow he competed in the keirin. He finished twice third and did not reach the second round.

Results in major competitions

Speed skating 

2010
24th Dutch Single Distance Championships, 1500 meter
17th Dutch Allround Championships, 500m: 15th, 1500m: 15th, 5000m: 15th
6th Dutch Junior Single Distance Championships, 10.000m (neo-senior)
2011
17th Dutch Single Distance Championships, 500 meter
22nd Dutch Allround Championships, 500m: 6th, 1500m: 21st, 5000m: 24th

Track cycling 
2011–2012
 Dutch National Amateur Sprint Champion
4th 2011 Dutch National Track Championships, 1 km time trial
7th 2011 Dutch National Track Championships, keirin
7th 2011 Dutch National Track Championships, sprint
2012–2013
  Grand Prix Vienna, team sprint
 6th 2012 European Track Championships, team sprint
 12th 2012 European Track Championships, keirin
 19th UCI Track Cycling World Cup Classic – Glasgow, keirin
6th 2012 Dutch National Track Championships, keirin

Personal records 
 Speed skating

Track cycling

References 

1989 births
Living people
Dutch male cyclists
Dutch male speed skaters
Dutch track cyclists
People from Woerden
Cyclists from Utrecht (province)